The Municipality of Lorne is a rural municipality (RM) in the Canadian province of Manitoba.

History

The RM was created on January 1, 2015 via the amalgamation of the RM of Lorne and the villages of Notre-Dame-de-Lourdes and Somerset. It was formed as a requirement of The Municipal Amalgamations Act, which required that municipalities with a population less than 1,000 amalgamate with one or more neighbouring municipalities by 2015. The Government of Manitoba initiated these amalgamations in order for municipalities to meet the 1997 minimum population requirement of 1,000 to incorporate a municipality.

Communities 
Local urban districts
Notre-Dame-de-Lourdes
Somerset
Unincorporated
 Altamont
 Bruxelles
 Cardinal
 Mariapolis
 St. Alphonse
 St. Leon
 St. Lupicin
 Swan Lake

Demographics 

References 

2015 establishments in Manitoba
Manitoba municipal amalgamations, 2015
Populated places established in 2015
Rural municipalities in Manitoba